Seiko Lee (born Tokyo, Japan) is a Japanese soprano who began her musical studies at age four in Tokyo. As a member of the NHK Children's Choir for ten years she traveled on several good-will tours including a concert tour of Eastern Europe. After marrying a South Korean she became interested in Korean music and has performed extensively in Korea. Her second CD, Liberation, is a collection of well-known Korean art songs. The Liberation CD was an important factor in her being invited to sing in North Korea.

As a professional she has performed in both the opera house and concert stage in Europe, South America, Asia and the United States. She has recorded as soloist for Sony, RCA Victor and Manhattan Center Records.

Her concert tours have taken her to several of the world's preeminent venues including New York's Lincoln Center, Manhattan Center and Madison Square Garden, Japan's Makuhari Messe and Shin Koguki-kan Stadium and Seoul's Olympic Stadium in 1992 where she performed for 120,000 people as part of the first World Cultural and Sports Festival. She has performed for many world dignitaries including the Japanese Emperor and former heads of state including Sir Edward Heath of Britain, Kenneth Kuanda of Zambia, Rodrigo Escobar Navia of Columbia and Stanislav Shushkevich of Belarus.

She is a graduate of the Tokyo Metropolitan Art High School (music major) and the Tokyo National University of Fine Arts (Tokyo Geidai). After graduating she came to the United States and has appeared in international opera productions including Carmen, Macbeth, La traviata, Suor Angelica, Così fan tutte, and Un Destino Immortale. In addition, she has performed with the Japan Opera Studio in Tokyo. She made her US operatic debut in New York City with the La Scaletta Opera and she has also appeared with the Connecticut Opera and New York's Henry Street Opera. In 1998, she presented a joint recital in Asunción, Paraguay with national icon, Gloria del Paraguay.

Since 1996, she has been a frequent soloist with the New York City Symphony and the NYC Symphony Chamber Ensemble. In 1996, she toured with the NYC Symphony Chamber Ensemble in concerts in New York, Los Angeles, San Francisco, Chicago, Connecticut and Washington, D.C. In 1998 and 1999, she appeared as a soloist at the Lincoln Center with New York's historic Goldman Memorial Band. In 2002, she appeared with the New York City Symphony Chamber Ensemble in the Temple Recital Series in Salt Lake City, Utah. In 2005 she was the featured soloist at the inaugural ceremony of the Universal Peace Federation at Lincoln Center's Alice Tully Hall.

Lee appeared as a featured soloist in "Soprano's World Concert for World Peace" Paraguay 2007 in Asunción, Paraguay.

Peace Advocacy

Beyond her career as a concert artist, Lee has exhibited a deep concern for issues of world peace and human rights.

She released her first CD Songs of Peace and in 2005 she released her second CD, "Liberation-Songs of My Spiritual Country" dedicated to the peace initiative of healing the enmity between Japan and South Korea. She has traveled extensively to Japan and Korea to promote the healing and reconciliation of these two countries through music. She has made frequent appearances at the United Nations in peace concerts for reconciliation and healing as well. Her concerts in North Korea are also a result of her peace advocacy through music. She has performed in concert in North Korea in 2006, 2007 and 2008. She was recipient of the Gold Medal award for her performance in 2008 at the International Art Festival in Pyongyang.

In 2005 and 2006 she appeared with the renowned, Israeli vocalist David D'Or in Jerusalem as part of the Middle East Peace Initiative Concerts for Interreligious Unity.

In April 2006 she returned to Tel Aviv where she appeared with the R’ananna Symphony Orchestra as a featured vocalist in the premiere recording of the 40-minute ten-movement "peace cantata", "Halelu--Songs of David", co-composed by David D'Or and David Eaton.  The composition for solo voices, chorus, and orchestra, was a collaborative effort of D’Or and Eaton.  Halelu is sung in English, Hebrew, Arabic and Latin, with greetings of peace of Judaism, Christianity and Islam figuring prominently in the lyrical content of several movements.

On May 19, 2007, she performed with D'Or in the world premier performance of "Halelu--Songs of David", at the Sava Center in Belgrade, Serbia.  The concert was televised to six other Eastern European countries.  Eaton conducted the combined Belgrade Philharmonic Orchestra and the 120-voice choir of the Academic Cultural Artistic Society.

She appeared with Maestro Eaton and David D'Or in a second performance of Halelu in Sofia, Bulgaria on October 8, 2007, with the Sofia Philharmonic and Chorus. She was a feature soloist at the 9/11 Peace Gala commemorative concert in New York's Central Park. Her European recital tour in 2011 took her to Paris, Geneva, Vienna and Linz.

Seiko Lee is the president of the Seiko Lee Project, a non-profit organization, and has contributed to numerous social and charitable activities, including reconciliation projects for Rwanda, Zambia, West Africa and Guinea Bissau.

In 2011 and 2012 she presented two European concert tours. In November 2012 she was the featured performer at the Universal Peace Federation's Leadership and Good Governance Award Ceremony honoring Nassir Abdulaziz Al-Nasser, former President of the 66th Session of the United Nations General Assembly in New York.

In October 2017, Lee performed at a memorial charity in Germany for the 500th anniversary of Martin Luther’s proclamation of the Ninety-five Theses in Düsseldorf.

Healing Through Song

Beginning in 2008, Lee performed a series of concerts in Asia promoting breast cancer awareness for the Japan Association of Breast Cancer and Thyroid Sonology (JABTS). These Pink Ribbon concerts tool place on Yokohama City and Yamato City. Her concerts were initiated in Nepal and have taken place primarily in Japan including performances at the Dokkyo Medical University Hospital and Yamato Seiwa Hospital. She appeared in recital at the historic Bunka Kaikan Concert Hall in Tokyo in 2009. In October 2011 she presented Pink Ribbon concerts at Dokkyo University Medical Hospital accompanied by Michael Bukhman, and in November she presented an encore concert in her hometown of Shibuya at the Masao Koga/Keyaki Hall Music Memorial Hall. In February 2012 she made her fifth appearance at New York's Merkin Hall with the Ureuk Symphony Orchestra, with a recital in April the same year when she returned to Yamaha Hall in Ginza, with the renowned Aperto String Quartet and pianist Michael Bukhman.

Since the Japan earthquake and tsunami of 2011, Lee has presented numerous benefit concerts, in Japanese cities of Tokyo, Tochigi and Shiga, as well as back in New York, Ohio and Los Angeles, supporting the relief efforts at those locations. Her concert in Columbus, Ohio was featured on both the NBC and CBS news affiliates there. Her Los Angeles benefit concert in July 2011 in conjunction with actor Shin Koyamada ("The Last Samurai")'s Koyamada Foundation was recorded and broadcast on four occasions by UTV in Hollywood.

Recordings and video

 Song of Peace: CD, Music by Sibelius, Gounod, Rodgers and Hammerstein, etc. Copyright, SeikoLee Project, 2001
 Liberation-Songs of My Spiritual Country, CD, Traditional Korean Melodies, Copyright, SeikoLee Project, 2005
 Halelu-Songs of David, CD, Cantata for Peace, Music by David D'Or and David Eaton, Copyright, David Eaton/David D'Or, 2006
 Seiko Lee, Holiday Benefit & World Tour Concert, DVD, Live Concert, Copyright, SeikoLee Project, 2007

References

Additional sources 
 La Nación: "Three Sopranos Began its International Tour Today, the BCP", November 14, 2007
 La Nación: "The sopranos provided a spectacle of luxury CPB, November 16, 2007
 Saegae Ilbo: Concert Review by Dong Kyung Pak, June 15, 2005
 Denver Korean Times (Han Kook Ilbo): "Seiko Lee, vocal recital", October 2, 1999
 Tiempos del Mundo: Article/Concert Notice in Paraguay, September 3, 1998.
 Nepal News: "Voice of Peace", by Anand Gurug, March 16, 2008
 The Barrytown Gazette: "Redhook Housewife's music brings joy, healing to the world." by Henry Christopher, April 2008

External links
 Official Website of Seiko Lee
Facebook page
 Seiko Lee Project, a N.P.O. 501 (c) (3) tax exempt Organization

Japanese operatic sopranos
Living people
Year of birth missing (living people)
Singers from Tokyo
20th-century Japanese women opera singers
21st-century Japanese women opera singers